Number 1 TV  is a Turkish music television channel. It was launched in 1994.

Shows
Hit
Start
35mm
On Air
Mixer
Instant Request
Performance
Nası'Yapalım
Backstage
KaraokeVan
Triple Play

Television stations in Turkey
Turkish-language television stations
Music television channels
Television channels and stations established in 1994
Music organizations based in Turkey